Šajkaš is a village located in the Titel municipality, South Bačka District, Vojvodina, Serbia. As of 2011 census, it has a population of 4,374 inhabitants.

Name
In Serbian the village is known as Šajkaš (Шајкаш), in Croatian as Šajkaš, in Hungarian as Sajkásszentiván, and in German as Schatzdorf or Schajkasch-Sentiwan.

History
The Šajkaška district was the scene of a notorious massacre during the occupation of Bačka by the Hungarian army in January 1942. This cost almost 900 lives. The German minority left the village in 1944.

Demographics

As of 2011 census, the village of Šajkaš has a population of 4,374 inhabitants.

See also
 List of places in Serbia
 List of cities, towns and villages in Vojvodina

References
 Slobodan Ćurčić: Broj stanovnika Vojvodine (Novi Sad, 1996).

External links

Places in Bačka
South Bačka District